Augustus George Hazard (April 28, 1802 – May 7, 1868), known as Colonel Augustus Hazard, was an American manufacturer of gunpowder and the namesake of Hazardville, Connecticut.

Hazard was born in Kingston, Rhode Island, on April 28, 1802, a son of Thomas and Silence Knowles Hazard. His family moved to Connecticut when he was six years old. As a young man, he worked as a merchant in Savannah, Georgia. In 1827 he relocated to New York City, where he was a commission agent engaged in the sale of gunpowder and other products. In 1837 he bought into a gunpowder production company that had been established two years earlier on the Scantic River in the town of Enfield, Connecticut. He assumed sole ownership of the company in 1843. The business was known thereafter as the Hazard Powder Company, and the village that supported it became known as Hazardville.

During the early years of the Civil War, Colonel Hazard was under suspicion by the federal government as being sympathetic to the Southern cause. It was well known that he was a good friend of Confederate President Jefferson Davis, and that he lived in the South and had developed many business relationships. Shortly before South Carolina seceded from the Union, it bought 80,000 lbs. of powder that was used to propel the first shots fired on Fort Sumter. In fact, much of the powder in the Southern arsenals at the outset of the war was manufactured by the Connecticut company.

The rapidly increasing demand for powder products compelled Hazard to hurry to expand his facilities to meet war time production needs. Soon Hazard Powder was supplying the Union Forces with 12,500 lbs of powder a day. The mill at Hazardville was in operation 24 hours a day and produced 40% of all the gunpowder used during the Civil War by the Union.

Hazard lived on Enfield Street in Enfield, several miles from the powder mill, and ran the business until his death on May 7, 1868, at Ascot House in New York City.

References 

19th-century American businesspeople
People from Enfield, Connecticut
People from South Kingstown, Rhode Island
1802 births
1868 deaths
Hazard family of Rhode Island